Below there are the squads from the participating teams of the 2011 Men's European Volleyball League.

























References

2011 in volleyball
European Volleyball League men's squads